Chicoutimi/Saint-Honoré Aerodrome  is located  east southeast of Saint-Honoré and approximately  from Chicoutimi in Quebec, Canada.

History
The site, north of the Saguenay River, was selected by the Royal Canadian Air Force in the summer of 1941 and construction began shortly thereafter with the aerodrome opening in June 1942 as RCAF Station St-Honoré. It was operated as a sub-base to RCAF Station Bagotville and supported pilot training during the Second World War under the British Commonwealth Air Training Plan. It was closed on January 5, 1945 and was subsequently transferred to the local community after it ceased to have a military purpose. RCAF Station Bagotville was reactivated in 1951 as a training and operational base and continues to this day as CFB Bagotville.

Aerodrome

All three runways were listed as "under construction" and detailed as follows:

References

External links
 Page about this airport on COPA's Places to Fly airport directory

Canadian Forces bases in Canada (closed)
Airports of the British Commonwealth Air Training Plan
Royal Canadian Air Force stations
Transport in Saguenay, Quebec
Registered aerodromes in Saguenay–Lac-Saint-Jean